"Todo y Nada" ("Everything and Nothing") is a song written and performed by Mexican singer  released in 1957. 
It was covered by Mexican singer Luis Miguel on his album Segundo Romance (1994) where it was released as the third single from the album in 1995 and reached number three on the Billboard Hot Latin Songs and number one on the Latin Pop Airplay charts, becoming his third number-one song on the latter chart. "Todo y Nada" became Miguel's third consecutive number-one song from Segundo Romance in Mexico; and became a top-five hit in Chile, Panama and Puerto Rico.

This was the second time that Luis Miguel had covered a song by Garrido, the first being "No Me Platiqués Más" on Romance (1991). It was recognized as one best-performing Latin songs of the year at the 1996 BMI Latin Awards.

Charts

Weekly charts

Year-end charts

See also
List of number-one Billboard Latin Pop Airplay songs of 1995

References 

1957 songs
1995 singles
Luis Miguel songs
Warner Music Latina singles
Boleros